The 2011–12 CONCACAF Champions League group stage were played from August to October 2011. The matchdays were August 16–18, August 23–25, September 13–15, September 20–22, September 27–29, and October 18–20, 2011.

The draw for the preliminary round and the group stage was held on May 18, 2011, at the CONCACAF headquarters in New York City. Teams from the same association (excluding "wildcard" teams which replace a team from another association) may not be drawn with each other.

A total of 16 teams competed, which include 8 automatic qualifiers and 8 winners of the Preliminary Round. The teams were divided into four groups of four, where each team played each other home-and-away in a round-robin format. The top two teams of each group advanced to the Championship Round.

Tiebreakers
If two teams are tied on points, the following tie-breaking criteria shall be applied, in order, to determine the ranking of teams:
 Greater number of points earned in matches between the teams concerned
 Greater goal difference in matches between the teams concerned
 Greater number of goals scored away from home in matches between the teams concerned
 Reapply first three criteria if two or more teams are still tied
 Greater goal  difference in all group matches
 Greater number of goals scored in group matches
 Greater number of goals scored away in all group matches
 Drawing of lots

Groups
The schedule of the first two rounds was released on July 28, 2011, by CONCACAF. The remainder of the schedule was announced on August 9, 2011, following the conclusion of the preliminary round.

All Times U.S. Eastern Daylight Time (UTC−04:00)

Group A

Group B

Group C

Notes
Note 1: Match originally played on August 24, 2011 (kickoff 20:00), but abandoned at halftime due to lightning, heavy rain, and a tornado warning (FC Dallas was leading 1–0 on a goal by Jackson Gonçalves in the 18th minute). Replayed the next day restarting at 0–0 as tournament regulations required unfinished games be replayed completely.

Group D

Notes
Note 2: Match originally to be played on August 23, 2011 (kickoff 22:00), but postponed to the next day due to heavy rain.

References

External links
 CONCACAF Champions League official website

Group stage